The Battle of Kolding was fought between a Prussian army under Eduard von Bonin and the Danish army under Frederik Rubeck Bülow in Eastern Jutland. The Prussians were victorious and the Danish army were forced to retreat towards Vejle and Fredericia.

Background

After the cessation of the truce with Prussia, hostilities resumed on April 3, 1849. It happened after a failed skin maneuver with the liner Christian VIII and the frigate Gefion on April 5 in the Egernførde fjord, where they tried to keep the Schleswig-Holstein army in the belief that a landing could take place there. The Germans then marched north, and after a few hours of fighting, Major General Olaf Rye withdrew to the Almind area.

Prelude
On April 7, 1849, General Rye's corps stood in a cantonment north of Kolding å, with outposts along the river and Nebel å. The river then formed the border of the duchies. General Rye was ordered to spare the city of Kolding from fierce resistance and thus bombardment. A reconnaissance on 19 April showed that Brigadier General Bonin's troops were in a line from Rebæk by Kolding Fjord, north of Dalby and Vonsild to Fovslet. This line corresponded to the border between North Jutland and the Duchy of Schleswig. General Rye awaited an imminent attack and therefore withdrew his outposts to a line close to the south of the city. On April 20 at At 5 o'clock in the morning, Brigadier General Bonin ordered his second-in-command, Colonel Zastrow, to return the Danish outposts. The outposts consisted of two companies of 1st Hunter Corps. The company G.W. Caroc and 4 espingols under First Lieutenant L.C.C.M. Schow of the Espincol battery Meincke in the city. A half company had shot forward in an arc south of the bridge at Søndergade. Another half-company guarded the bridge and the north side of the Kolding river with the espingols distributed in houses east of the bridge. Kl. At 6.30 the Prussians advanced in three columns. Captain Caroc then drew his advanced force over to the north side of the creek. The Jutland hunters and the Espingols fought relentlessly. When the ammunition began to run out, Captain Caroc ordered the Espingols to withdraw, during which First Lieutenant Schow was severely wounded. Next, Captain Caroc first ordered the left wing back and then the right wing. At this meeting, there were 30 dead and wounded and 17 captured on the Danish side. The losses of the Prussians were about the same.

Since Lieutenant General Bonin had now crossed the border into North Jutland, Lieutenant General Frederik Bülow decided to put all his strength into throwing the Schleswig-Holsteinians back across the border and began the attack on 23 April in the morning.

Battle
In the morning, the Danes attacked the Prussian positions over a broad front and met fierce resistance. Bülow's brigade fought all the way to the Castle Lake and met a lot of resistance here. Ryes and Moltke's brigades had conquered the bridge at Ejstrup, but met resistance at Vejlevej. The Prussian Brigadier General Bonin felt pressured and ordered his flanks together in a wedge shape and withdrew a little, but only to regroup. The Danes believed that the battle had been won, but the Prussians returned with 12 pound cannons and reinforcements from Kolding's southern area and fought hard for Kolding's center. As they were close to cutting off Ryes and Moltke's brigades, Bülow withdrew towards Vejle and Fredericia, and the battle was lost.

Bibliography
 Kim Mikkelsen, Det glemte Slag – Kampene omkring Kolding 23. April 1849 1999  (opplag på bare 1000 stk.)

Kolding 1849
Kolding 1849
Kolding 1849
1849 in Denmark
April 1849 events